Tule Springs Ranch and the remaining buildings are listed as a district on the United States National Register of Historic Places in Las Vegas, Nevada.  Part of the area is included in the Tule Springs Archaeological Site and is listed on the U.S. National Register of Historic Places.  The building are part of the Floyd Lamb Park at Tule Springs which is operated by the City of Las Vegas. 
Located about 20 miles from the Strip off U.S. Highway 95 north.

History 
The ranch district was listed on the National Register of Historic Places on September 23, 1981.

The first establishment at Tule Springs may have been the U.S. Hotel owned by a Mr. Levandowski (ca. 1905). In 1916 a Mormon settler, Bert Nay, filed for water rights on the site. Nay sold the ranch to Gilbert Hefner in 1928, who owned the property until 1941 when he sold it to Sheriff Gene Ward, who in turn sold it to Prosper Jacob Goumond. Most of the buildings on the ranch date from the 1940s, when Goumond was developing the Tule Springs Ranch into a "divorce ranch."

References 

History of Las Vegas
National Register of Historic Places in Las Vegas
Buildings and structures in Las Vegas
Ranches on the National Register of Historic Places in Nevada
Tourist attractions in the Las Vegas Valley
Historic districts on the National Register of Historic Places in Nevada